Tim Johnston (born 28 October 1990) is a New Zealand former first-class cricketer who played for Canterbury.

Johnston was named Canterbury Bowler of the Year for 2018 at the CCA Annual Awards. Johnston joined the Sydenham Cricket Club, Christchurch, New Zealand for the 2018–19 season and was made the Premier Men's captain for the 2019–20 season.

References

External links
 

1990 births
Living people
New Zealand cricketers
Canterbury cricketers
Cricketers from Christchurch